The 1978 Cronulla-Sutherland Sharks season was the 12th in the club's history. They competed in the NSWRFL's 1978 Premiership and finished 2nd (out of 15). They then went on to reach the grand final against Manly-Warringah, which had to be replayed and was ultimately lost. The Sharks also competed in the 1978 Amco Cup.

For the end of season 1978 Kangaroo tour, Greg Pierce, who captained City and New South Wales during the season, was selected as vice captain. Steve Kneen and Steve Rogers also went on the tour.

Ladder

References

Cronulla-Sutherland Sharks seasons
Cronulla-Sutherland Sharks season